A daddy in gay culture is a slang term meaning an (typically) older man sexually involved in a relationship or wanting sex with a younger male. The age gap and maturity gap is key to the relationship. 

The term has increasingly been applied to heterosexual relationships. In addition to being older and/or more experienced, it can sometimes have connotations of submission. 

In the homonormative sense, a dad (or daddy) is a gay man who applies a state of mind that encompasses care, consideration, mentorship and leadership to a gay junior male. A dad is usually a cis-gendered male, but this may not always be the case. The dad has the welfare of a younger man at heart, and his natural impulse is benevolent guardianship.

In the heteronormative sense, the father/son, teacher/student, coach/protégé relationship is assumed to be finite and not questioned, but an ongoing relationship is looked at askance. Dad–son relationships are a form of mentoring, and the shared homosexuality of the partners is a personal extension of societal gender norms and expectations about masculinities. Most partners in dad–son relationships subscribe to common values: masculinity is praised and therefore celebrated between them. It has become a stereotype in the gay community.

Age difference may be the initial attraction, but it is more a mutual attitude that makes the dad–son relationship work and thrive. There is a resonance between both dad and son based on essential personal values: recognition of different levels of experience; honesty and clarity in communication; a lack of selfishness and a capacity for giving; the need for mutual emotional expression; guidance and learning; and an acute awareness of respect and boundaries. Additionally, the negotiation between dad and son can galvanise right-minded behaviors and resolve inner conflicts in both parties. Both will be better men for it. This resonance dictates that the relationship is negotiable but based on mutual organisation and complementary self-discipline and restraint. In a healthy relationship, there is genuine and mutual admiration.

References

LGBT slang
Pornography terminology